Charles F. Wheeler  (December 15, 1915 – October 28, 2004) was an American cinematographer.

Biography 
Wheeler did much of his work for Walt Disney. He served as a combat photographer in the United States Navy during World War II. He died in 2004 after developing Alzheimer's disease. In 1970 he was nominated for the Academy Award for Best Cinematography; along with Osamu Furuya, Shinsaku Himeda, and Masamichi Satoh; for Tora! Tora! Tora!. He had also been nominated for a Primetime Emmy Award for Babe, a biopic about Babe Zaharias.

Partial filmography 
Duel at Diablo (1966)
The Bubble (1966)                                                                
C.C. and Company (1970)
Tora! Tora! Tora! (1970)
Silent Running (1972)
The War Between Men and Women (1972)
Slaughter's Big Rip-Off (1973)                                                                     
Bad Ronald (1974)
The Lindbergh Kidnapping Case (1976) (TV)
Freaky Friday (1976)
The Cat from Outer Space (1978)
Christmas Eve on Sesame Street (1978) (uncredited)
C.H.O.M.P.S. (1979)
The Last Flight of Noah's Ark (1980)
Condorman (1981)
The Pursuit of D. B. Cooper (1981)
The Best of Times (1986)

References

External links 

American cinematographers
People from Memphis, Tennessee
Deaths from dementia in California
Deaths from Alzheimer's disease
1915 births
2004 deaths
United States Navy personnel of World War II
American war photographers